Groma Rock is the 45 m long in south-north direction and 30 m wide rock off the northwest extremity of Low Island in the South Shetland Islands. Its surface area is 0.1 ha.

The feature is named after the ancient Roman surveying instrument groma, and in association with other names in the area deriving from the early development or use of geodetic instruments and methods.

Location
British mapping in 2009.

See also
 List of Antarctic and subantarctic islands

Maps

 South Shetland Islands: Smith and Low Islands. Scale 1:150000 topographic map No. 13677. British Antarctic Survey, 2009
 Antarctic Digital Database (ADD). Scale 1:250000 topographic map of Antarctica. Scientific Committee on Antarctic Research (SCAR). Since 1993, regularly upgraded and updated

Notes

References
 Bulgarian Antarctic Gazetteer. Antarctic Place-names Commission. (details in Bulgarian, basic data in English)

External links
 Groma Rock. Adjusted Copernix satellite image

Rock formations of the South Shetland Islands
Bulgaria and the Antarctic